Apartment of Stefan Żeromski at the Royal Castle in Warsaw (Mieszkanie Stefana Żeromskiego na Zamku Królewskim w Warszawie) is a writer's house museum in Warsaw, Poland. It is the apartment room that Stefan Zeromski, a Polish novelist and dramatist, once stayed in.

References

Museums in Warsaw
Literary museums in Poland
Historic house museums in Poland
Biographical museums in Poland